The 2014–15 season will be Budapest Honvéd FC's 104th competitive season, 10th consecutive season in the OTP Bank Liga and 105th year in existence as a football club.

First team squad

Transfers

Summer

In:

Out:

Winter

In:

Out:

List of Hungarian football transfers summer 2014
List of Hungarian football transfers winter 2014–15

Statistics

Appearances and goals
Last updated on 6 December 2014.

|-
|colspan="14"|Youth players:

|-
|colspan="14"|Out to Loan:

|-
|colspan="14"|Players no longer at the club:

|}

Top scorers
Includes all competitive matches. The list is sorted by shirt number when total goals are equal.

Last updated on 6 December 2014

Disciplinary record
Includes all competitive matches. Players with 1 card or more included only.

Last updated on 6 December 2014

Overall
{|class="wikitable"
|-
|Games played || 27 (17 OTP Bank Liga, 4 Hungarian Cup and 6 Hungarian League Cup)
|-
|Games won || 10 (3 OTP Bank Liga, 3 Hungarian Cup and 4 Hungarian League Cup)
|-
|Games drawn || 6 (4 OTP Bank Liga, 1 Hungarian Cup and 1 Hungarian League Cup)
|-
|Games lost || 11 (10 OTP Bank Liga, 0 Hungarian Cup and 1 Hungarian League Cup)
|-
|Goals scored || 37
|-
|Goals conceded || 35
|-
|Goal difference || +2
|-
|Yellow cards || 61
|-
|Red cards || 4
|-
|rowspan="1"|Worst discipline ||  Raffaele Alcibiade (6 , 2 )
|-
|rowspan="2"|Best result || 7–3 (H) v Csákvár - Ligakupa - 16-09-2014
|-
| 4–0 (H) v Gyirmót - Ligakupa - 08-10-2014
|-
|rowspan="1"|Worst result || 0–4 (A) v Debrecen - OTP Bank Liga - 04-10-2014
|-
|rowspan="2"|Most appearances ||  Patrik Hidi (23 appearances)
|-
|  Szabolcs Kemenes (23 appearances)
|-
|rowspan="1"|Top scorer ||  Souleymane Youla (8 goals)
|-
|Points || 36/81 (44.44%)
|-

Nemzeti Bajnokság I

Matches

Classification

Results summary

Results by round

Hungarian Cup

League Cup

Group stage

Last 16

Quarter finals

Semi-final

References

External links
 Eufo
 Official Website
 UEFA
 fixtures and results

Budapest Honvéd FC seasons
Budapest Honved